Marc Lincoln Marks (February 12, 1927 – February 28, 2018) was a former Republican member of the U.S. House of Representatives.

Marks served in the United States Army Air Corps from 1945 to 1946.  He graduated from the University of Alabama in 1951, and the University of Virginia at Charlottesville, Virginia in 1954, and served as Mercer County Solicitor (district attorney) from 1960 to 1966.

In the 1976 United States House of Representatives Elections, Marks defeated the Pennsylvania six-term Democratic incumbent Joseph Vigorito with an 11% margin, one of eight Democrats unseated nationwide. He defeated Vigorito again in the 1978 election with a 26% margin, and state Representative David C. DiCarlo in 1980 by 120 votes. A serious back ailment led him to not seek re-election for a fourth term in 1982. This decision prompted a speech to the House of Representatives in March 1982, before House Speaker Tip O'Neill, in which he brought into question his own support of Reaganite policies, that, he argued, had an undue emphasis on military spending, and had caused distress to those to whom he defined as "disadvantaged". Prior to leaving Congress, John B. Connally talked to Marks and considered him as a running mate, during Connally's failed 1980 Presidential bid.

In a letter to Time Magazine he defended his position in voting for contempt proceedings against James G. Watt, Secretary of the Interior. His letter to The New York Times criticized what he saw as the Times' editorial board's irresponsibility in criticizing public officials, and apparent lack of knowledge of the plight of unemployed citizens. In 1994, Bill Clinton nominated Marks as Commissioner of the Federal Mine Safety and Health Review Commission. He died at the age of 91 in 2018.

See also
 List of Jewish members of the United States Congress

References

External links

 The Spokes-man Review, retrieved March 2, 2011
 The Herald, Sharon P.A., retrieved March 2, 2011, retrieved March 2, 2011
 Business Publications: Global Network Privacy, retrieved March 2, 2011

1927 births
2018 deaths
People from Farrell, Pennsylvania
Jewish members of the United States House of Representatives
Republican Party members of the United States House of Representatives from Pennsylvania
Pennsylvania lawyers
University of Alabama alumni
University of Virginia alumni
United States Army Air Forces soldiers
United States Army personnel of World War II
Military personnel from Pennsylvania
20th-century American lawyers
21st-century American Jews